Living with the Enemy may refer to:

 Living with the Enemy (Australian TV series), 2014
 Living with the Enemy (radio programme), 2006
 Living with the Enemy (U.S. TV series), 2015